Oak Grove is a city in Anoka County, Minnesota, United States. It is north of Minneapolis. The population was 8,031 at the 2010 census.

Geography
County Roads 7, 9, 13, 22, and 78 are the main routes in the community. State Highway 47 (MN 47) passes briefly through the northwest corner of Oak Grove.

Lake George is located within the city of Oak Grove.

Adjacent cities
 St. Francis (north)
 East Bethel (east)
 Ham Lake (southeast)
 Andover (south)
 Ramsey (southwest)
 Nowthen (west)

History
Oak Grove first became an organized township in 1857, and was so named because of the large groves of oak trees in the area.  The village of Oak Grove was founded in 1854, and a post office operated from 1857 to 1901.  The township incorporated as the city of Oak Grove in 1993.

Demographics

2010 census
As of the census of 2010, there were 8,031 people, 2,744 households, and 2,237 families residing in the city. The racial makeup of the city was 95.8% White, 0.5% African American, 0.3% Native American, 1.9% Asian, 0.3% from other races, and 1.3% from two or more races. Hispanic or Latino of any race were 1.2% of the population.

There were 2,744 households, of which 39.8% had children under the age of 18 living with them, 72.6% were married couples living together, 4.7% had a female householder with no husband present, 4.3% had a male householder with no wife present, and 18.5% were non-families. 13.1% of all households were made up of individuals, and 3.6% had someone living alone who was 65 years of age or older. The average household size was 2.92 and the average family size was 3.21.

The median age in the city was 40 years. 26.5% of residents were under the age of 18; 7.5% were between the ages of 18 and 24; 24.6% were from 25 to 44; 33.3% were from 45 to 64; and 8.2% were 65 years of age or older. The gender makeup of the city was 52.3% male and 47.7% female.

2000 census
As of the census of 2000, there were 6,903 people, 2,200 households, and 1,883 families residing in the city. The racial makeup of the city was 97.20% White, 0.51% African American, 0.68% Native American, 0.48% Asian, 0.22% from other races, and 0.91% from two or more races. Hispanic or Latino of any race were 0.59% of the population.

There were 2,200 households, out of which 45.6% had children under the age of 18 living with them, 76.3% were married couples living together, 5.0% had a female householder with no husband present, and 14.4% were non-families. 10.6% of all households were made up of individuals, and 1.6% had someone living alone who was 65 years of age or older.  The average household size was 3.11 and the average family size was 3.33.

In the city, the population was spread out, with 32.0% under the age of 18, 6.8% from 18 to 24, 33.8% from 25 to 44, 23.9% from 45 to 64, and 3.5% who were 65 years of age or older.  The median age was 34 years. For every 100 females, there were 114.4 males.  For every 100 females age 18 and over, there were 112.8 males.

The median income for a household in the city was $70,169, and the median income for a family was $73,728. Males had a median income of $44,855 versus $29,009 for females. The per capita income for the city was $23,693.  About 1.0% of families and 1.5% of the population were below the poverty line, including 0.9% of those under age 18 and 3.6% of those age 65 or over.

Notable person
 Sean Sherk – retired mixed martial artist and former UFC Lightweight Champion, is from Oak Grove

In popular culture
 Golan the Insatiable, an animated television series that first aired in Fox's Animation Domination High-Def programming block in November 2013, is about "a menacing godlord from another dimension" who becomes trapped in a small Minnesota town, and is set in Oak Grove.

References

External links
 Oak Grove City Website

Cities in Anoka County, Minnesota
Cities in Minnesota
Defunct townships in Minnesota